Jean Jacques Machado (born February 12, 1968) is a Brazilian Jiu jitsu practitioner. He is one of the five Machado brothers (Carlos, Roger, Rigan and John). Machado is nephew of BJJ co-founder and Grandmaster Carlos Gracie, and learned the martial art from an early age. He is married to Jaqueline Machado. They married on September 29, 1988 in Rio de Janeiro Brazil, they have two daughters, Jullie and Camilla.

Machado is known for his grappling skills having won ADCC Submission Wrestling World Championships in his weight division plus a runner up in the open division in 2001.

Biography
Machado was born in Rio de Janeiro, Brazil and suffered birth defects resulting from amniotic band syndrome, which left him with only the thumb and the little finger on his left hand. Despite this congenital problem, which directly affects the skill of gripping, he began his Jiu-Jitsu training over thirty years ago and dominated the competitive arena of Brazilian Jiu-Jitsu in his native country, capturing every major title and competition award from 1982 through 1992.

In 1992, Machado arrived in the United States where he continued competing successfully.

On June 6, 2011 in a private ceremony held at the Rickson Gracie Academy in West Los Angeles, Machado was promoted to a 7th degree red-and-black belt. This prestigious promotion is in recognition of Machado's 25 years as a black belt instructor, competitor and champion.

Professional titles
 Rio de Janeiro Jiu-Jitsu State Championships
 Cruiserweight Champion: 11 consecutive years (1982–1992)
 Brazilian Jiu-Jitsu National Championships
 Cruiserweight Champion: 11 consecutive years (1982–1992)
 Sambo Wrestling Championships
 National and Pan American Cruiserweight Champion
 1993 Oklahoma - 1st Place
 1994 San Diego, California - 1st Place
 Grappling Style Challenge Japan
 1995 - Champion
 Brazilian Jiu-Jitsu American Championships
 4 consecutive years (1995–1998)
 Black Belt Super Challenge Championships
 1998 - Champion
 2000 - Champion
 Abu Dhabi Submission Wrestling World Championships
 1999 - 66–76 kg Division Gold Medalist, Most Technical Fighter Award
 2000 - 66–76 kg Division Silver Medalist
 2001 - Absolute Division Silver Medalist, Best Match Award, Fastest Submission Award
 2005 - Superfight Runner Up

Instructor lineage
Jigoro Kano → Tomita Tsunejirō → Mitsuyo Maeda → Carlos Gracie Sr. → Hélio Gracie -> Rickson Gracie → Jean Jacques Machado

Mixed martial arts record

Submission grappling record
{| class="wikitable sortable" style="font-size:80%; text-align:left;"
|-
| colspan=9 style="text-align:center;" | 16 Matches, 12 Wins (10 Submissions), 4 Losses
|-
!  Result
!  style="text-align:center;"| Rec.
!  Opponent
!  Method
!  Event
!  Division
!  Date
!  Location
|-
|Loss||style="text-align:center;"|12-4|| Dean Lister || Points || ADCC 2005 || Superfight|| ||  Los Angeles, CA
|-
|Loss||style="text-align:center;"|12-3|| Ricardo Arona || Points ||rowspan=6| ADCC 2001 ||rowspan=4|Absolute||rowspan=4|||rowspan=6| Abu Dhabi
|-
|Win||style="text-align:center;"|12-2|| Ricardo Almeida || Points 
|-
|Win||style="text-align:center;"|11-2|| Márcio Cruz || Submission (kneebar)
|-
|Win||style="text-align:center;"|10-2|| Tsuyoshi Kohsaka || Submission (armbar) 
|-
|Loss||style="text-align:center;"|9-2|| Matt Serra || Penalty ||rowspan=2| –77 kg||rowspan=2|
|-
|Win||style="text-align:center;"|9-1|| Serguei Onishuk || Submission (rear naked choke) 
|-
|Loss||style="text-align:center;"|8-1|| Renzo Gracie || Advantage || rowspan=4| ADCC 2000 ||rowspan=4|–77 kg|| rowspan=2|||rowspan=4| Abu Dhabi
|-
|Win||style="text-align:center;"|8-0|| Leo Vieira || Points 
|-
|Win||style="text-align:center;"|7-0|| Mikey Burnett || Submission (ezekiel choke)||rowspan=2|
|-
|Win||style="text-align:center;"|6-0|| Marcio Barbosa || Submission (rear naked choke) 
|-
|Win||style="text-align:center;"|5-0|| Caol Uno || Submission (rear naked choke) || rowspan=4| ADCC 1999 ||rowspan=4|–77 kg||rowspan=2|||rowspan=4| Abu Dhabi
|-
|Win||style="text-align:center;"|4-0|| Hayato Sakurai || Submission (rear naked choke) 
|-
|Win||style="text-align:center;"|3-0|| Micah Pittman || Submission (rear naked choke)||rowspan=2|
|-
|Win||style="text-align:center;"|2-0|| Ryan Harvey || Submission (rear naked choke) 
|-
|Win||style="text-align:center;"|1-0|| Yuki Nakai || Submission (triangle choke) || Shooto: Vale Tudo Perception||Superfight ||September 26, 1995|| Tokyo
|-

See also
 List of Brazilian Jiu-Jitsu practitioners

References

External links
 
 
 

Brazilian jiu-jitsu trainers
People awarded a coral belt in Brazilian jiu-jitsu
Living people
People from Tarzana, Los Angeles
Brazilian male mixed martial artists
Mixed martial artists utilizing Brazilian jiu-jitsu
Sportspeople from Rio de Janeiro (city)
Jean Jacques
1968 births